Sarah Fabyan and Alice Marble were the defending champion, but were ineligible to compete after turning professional.

Louise Brough and Margaret Osborne defeated Pauline Betz and Doris Hart in the final, 6–3, 2–6, 6–3 to win the ladies' doubles tennis title at the 1946 Wimbledon Championships.

Seeds

  Louise Brough /  Margaret Osborne (champions)
  Pauline Betz /  Doris Hart (final)
  Jean Bostock /  Kay Menzies (semifinals)
  Dorothy Bundy /  Pat Todd (semifinals)

Draw

Finals

Top half

Section 1

Section 2

Section 3

Section 4

The nationalities of Miss A Massie and Miss DL Mollison are unknown.

References

External links

Women's Doubles
Wimbledon Championship by year – Women's doubles
Wimbledon Championships - doubles
Wimbledon Championship - doubles